Legislative elections were held in Belgium in June and July 1884, for partial Chamber and full Senate elections respectively. Voter turnout was 79.1% in the Chamber of Representatives elections, although only 69,276 people were eligible to vote.

Background

The election occurred during the First School War. The incumbent Liberal government under Walthère Frère-Orban aimed to secularize education, which sparked heavy protests from Catholics.

Regular partial elections for the Chamber of Representatives were held on Tuesday 10 June 1884, with a run-off on Tuesday 17 June. Under the alternating system, elections for the Chamber of Representatives were only held in five out of the nine provinces: Antwerp, Brabant, Luxembourg, Namur and West Flanders. Special elections were held in the arrondissements of Aalst and Sint-Niklaas, for one representative in each.

The result was a large victory for the Catholic Party. The Frère-Orban government resigned and was succeeded by a Catholic government led by Jules Malou, which immediately abolished the Ministry of Public Education.

The Liberals however retained a majority in the Senate, which was not up for election. It was subsequently dissolved, triggering its complete re-election. Senate elections were held on Tuesday 8 July 1884, with a run-off on Tuesday 15 July. The Catholic Party won 43 of the 69 seats in the Senate.

The election ended the First School War and marked the end of the last homogeneously liberal government. The Catholic Party under Jules Malou gained an absolute majority, which they would retain until the First World War.

Campaign
Among the 69 Chamber seats up for election:
 17 seats had uncontested Catholic candidates: Mechelen (3), Turnhout (3), Kortrijk (4), Roeselare (2), Tielt (2), Veurne (1), Diksmuide (1) and Bastogne (1).
 11 seats were likely Catholic wins: Leuven (5), Ypres (3), Dinant (2) and Marche (1).
 1 seat was likely Liberal: Arlon (1).
 40 seats were competitive:
 Antwerp (8), Nivelles (4) and Bruges (3) were historically competitive.
 Namur (4), Philippeville (2), Neufchâteau (1), Virton (1) were competitive since the 1870s.
 Brussels (16) was only since two years competitive.
 Ostend (1), until now solidly liberal, was now competitive.

The Catholics gained 27 Chamber seats from the Liberals: 16 in Brussels, four in Nivelles, two in Namur, one in Philippeville, one in Antwerp, one in Ostend, one in Neufchâteau and one in Bruges. The Liberals only retained the single seats in Arlon and Virton, both in Luxembourg.

Results

Chamber of Representatives

Senate

References

1880s elections in Belgium
General
Belgium
Belgium
Belgium